Duval is a village in the Canadian province of Saskatchewan within the Rural Municipality of Last Mountain Valley No. 250 and Census Division No. 11. The village is located on Highway 20 approximately 93 km north of the City of Regina.

History 
Duval incorporated as a village on December 21, 1910.

Demographics 

Climate

See also 

 List of communities in Saskatchewan
 Villages of Saskatchewan
 Duval

References

Villages in Saskatchewan
Last Mountain Valley No. 250, Saskatchewan
Division No. 11, Saskatchewan